Alessandra Patelli (born 17 November 1991) is an Italian rower. She competed in the women's coxless pair event at the 2016 Summer Olympics. She competed in Double sculls, at the 2020 Summer Olympics.

References

External links
 

1991 births
Living people
Italian female rowers
Olympic rowers of Italy
Rowers at the 2016 Summer Olympics
Rowers at the 2020 Summer Olympics
Place of birth missing (living people)
European Championships (multi-sport event) bronze medalists